José Maria Gralha (born 14 March 1905 - deceased) was a Portuguese footballer who played as forward.

References

External links 
 
 

1905 births
Portuguese footballers
Association football forwards
Portugal international footballers
Year of death missing
Place of birth missing